Tonelli is a surname, and may refer to:

 Tonelli (surname)

Arts
 Tonelli (film), a 1943 German film

Science 
 Tonelli's theorem (functional analysis)
 Tonelli's theorem
 Tonelli–Shanks algorithm
 Tonelli–Hobson test

See also